Headin' South is an album by American jazz pianist Horace Parlan featuring performances recorded in 1960 and released on the Blue Note label.

Reception
The Allmusic review by Stephen Thomas Erlewine awarded the album 4 stars and stated: "On the surface, Headin' South is another set of bluesy soul-jazz, but it actually finds the Horace Parlan trio stretching out a little... another understated but solid effort."

Track listing
All compositions by Horace Parlan except as indicated

 "Headin' South" - 4:29
 "The Song Is Ended" (Irving Berlin) - 5:55
 "Summertime" (George Gershwin, DuBose Heyward) - 5:59
 "Low Down" - 5:30
 "Congalegre" (Ray Barretto) - 4:24
 "Prelude to a Kiss" (Duke Ellington, Irving Gordon, Irving Mills) - 5:28
 "Jim Loves Sue" (Ahmad Jamal) - 4:32
 "My Mother's Eyes" (Abel Baer, L. Wolfe Gilbert) - 5:21

Personnel
Horace Parlan - piano
George Tucker - bass
Al Harewood - drums
Ray Barretto - congas (tracks 1, 2, 4, 5, 7 & 8)

References

Blue Note Records albums
Horace Parlan albums
1961 albums
Albums produced by Alfred Lion
Albums recorded at Van Gelder Studio